Araós is a locality and decentralized municipal entity located in the municipality of Alins, in Province of Lleida province, Catalonia, Spain. As of 2020, it has a population of 51.

Geography 
Araós is located 153km north-northeast of Lleida.

References

Populated places in the Province of Lleida